Gamalost (also Gammelost, Gammalost) is a traditional Norwegian   cheese.

History
Gamalost, which translates as old cheese, was once a staple of the Norwegian diet. The name might be due to the texture of the surface, or the fact that it is an old tradition, not the ripening which may take as little as two weeks. Like many traditional Norwegian foods, such as flat bread, dry salted meats and stockfish, Gamalost could be stored for long periods without refrigeration. 
The brownish-yellow cheese is firm, moist, coarse and often granular. Gamalost is rich in protein with low fat content, measuring 1% fat and 50% protein.

Production
To make Gamalost, lactic starter is added to skimmed cow's milk, causing it to sour.  After several days of souring, the milk is slowly heated, before the curds are separated and pressed into forms.  After removal from the forms, mold is introduced onto the surface of the cheese, either by exposure to the wooden walls of the form that is only used for Gammalost, or rubbed on by hand in the traditional method.  The cheese is then allowed to cure for four to five weeks. The ripening happens from outside inwards, so the center might be lighter than the parts near the exterior.

Gamalost production is very labor-intensive, particularly if traditional methods are used. Everything depends on the proper fermentation and maturation. It is not made in sufficient quantity for mass export.  As such, it is rare to find the cheese outside Norway. Commercial production has principally been limited to the Tine facility in Vik.

Gamalost Festival
Gamalost Festival (Gamalostfestivalen) is an annual event held in Vik in Sogn at the beginning of summer every year.

See also
 List of cheeses

References

Other sources

Related reading
Diehl, Kari Schoening (2012) The Everything Nordic Cookbook (Quarto - Everything Books) 
Scott, Astrid Karlsen  (2015) Authentic Norwegian Cooking: Traditional Scandinavian Cooking Made Easy (Skyhorse Publishing, Inc.)

External links

TINE in Norway
Synnøve Finden
Gamalostfestivalen

Norwegian cheeses
Dairy products
Blue cheeses
Cow's-milk cheeses
Acid-set cheeses